The Choghadak District is a district (bakhsh) in Bushehr County, Bushehr Province, Iran. At the 2016 census, its population was 30,659.  The District has one city: Choghadak. The District has two rural districts (dehestan): Chah Kutah and Doveyreh.

References 

Districts of Bushehr Province
Populated places in Bushehr County